Virginia Randall McLaws (1872-1967) was an American painter and educator.

Biography
McLaws was born on  August 9, 1872 in Augusta, Georgia. She studied at the Pennsylvania Academy of the Fine Arts. She was known for her landscapes of the American south, executed in an Impressionist style. From 1908 through 1938 she taught at Sweet Briar College in Sweet Briar, Virginia. She was a member of the American Federation of Arts and the Southern States Art League. McLaws died on August 11, 1967 in Savannah.

Her work is in the Morris Museum of Art.

References

External links
 images of Mclaws' work  on Invaluable

 
1872 births
1967 deaths
19th-century American women artists
20th-century American women artists
People from Augusta, Georgia